Independence class may refer to:

 , a series of United States Navy littoral combat ships
 , a series of Republic of Singapore Navy littoral mission ships
 , a series of light carriers built for the United States Navy that served during World War II